2007 Chile earthquake may refer to:

2007 Tocopilla earthquake, a 7.7-magnitude earthquake occurred in November 2007
2007 Aysen Fjord earthquake, a 6.2-magnitude earthquake occurred in January 2007

See also
List of earthquakes in Chile